Moment of Truth or The Moment of Truth may refer to:

Music

Album 
Moment of Truth (Gerald Wilson album), 1962
Moment of Truth (Terri Nunn album), 1991
Moment of Truth, a 2004 album by Da' T.R.U.T.H.
The Moment of Truth (compilation album), a 1999 album in The Emo Diaries series
Moment of Truth (ELO Part II album), 1994
Moment of Truth (Gang Starr album), 1998
The Moment of Truth (The Real Milli Vanilli album), 1990
Moment of Truth (Suzy Bogguss album), 1990
Moment of Truth (Man with No Name album), 1996
Moment of Truth, a 2013 album by Glenn Lewis
Moment of Truth (Tinsley Ellis album), 2007
The Moment of Truth (Crow Mother album), 2017

Song 
"Moment of Truth", a 1998 song by  Gang Starr from the album of the same name
"The Moment of Truth" (Survivor song), 1984, part of the soundtrack for The Karate Kid
"Moment of Truth", a 2004 song by Damageplan from album, New Found Power
"Moment of Truth", a 1971 song by Earth, Wind & Fire from album Earth, Wind & Fire
"Moment of Truth", a 1993 song by Jeff Watson from Around the Sun
"Moment of Truth", a 2001 song by Timothy B. Schmit from Feed the Fire

Film and television 
Moment of Truth (Canadian TV series), a Canadian serial drama television series which aired on CBC Television from 1964 to 1969
Moment of Truth (2021 TV series), an American true crime documentary about the unsolved murder of James R. Jordan Sr. in 1993.
The Moment of Truth (American game show), an American game show
The Moment of Truth (British game show), a British game show
Moment of Truth (film series), a series of made-for-television movies from the Lifetime cable channel
"The Moment of Truth" (Merlin), an episode of Merlin
The Moment of Truth (1952 film), a French film
The Moment of Truth (1965 film), an Italian film

Other 
Moment of truth (marketing), when a customer interacts with a product that changes an impression about that particular product
The Moment of Truth (novel), a 2003 novel based on the Star Wars franchise
The Moment of Truth (play), a 1951 satire comedy drama play by Peter Ustinov
The Moment of Truth (In the August of 1944) (novel), a 1973 novel by Vladimir Bogomolov

See also
Epiphany (disambiguation)